Shady Grove is an unincorporated area of Montgomery County, Maryland, United States. It has a population of 5,000-7,000, between the cities of Rockville and Gaithersburg, mostly in zip codes 20850 and 20855, though the exact boundaries are not officially defined.

History

Shady Grove is one of Montgomery County's upper middle class areas. The area is best identified by Shady Grove Road, which is located near exit 8 off of I-270. Other notable places in the area that bear the name are:

Shady Grove Metrorail station, although it is located in Derwood, Maryland.
Shady Grove Medical Village and Shady Grove Life Sciences Center
Shady Grove Adventist Hospital, although it is located in Rockville, Maryland.
Shady Grove Executive Center
 The Universities at Shady Grove

References

External links
The Universities at Shady Grove

Populated places in Montgomery County, Maryland